Lionel Edward Blackburne was an Anglican priest in the  second quarter of the 20th century.

He was born 2 November 1874 and educated at Lancing College and Clare College, Cambridge. Ordained in 1890, he began his ecclesiastical career  with a curacies at All Saints, Leamington and St Martin Potternewton. After this he was Vicar of St Wilfrid’s, Bradford then Rural Dean of Portsmouth. From 1922 to 1936 he was Archdeacon of Surrey and from 1930 also Canon Residentiary at Guildford Cathedral. He was Dean of Ely  from 1936  to 1950. He died on 4 August 1951.His brother was Dean of Bristol and nephew Bishop of Thetford.

Notes

1874 births
People educated at Lancing College
Alumni of Clare College, Cambridge
Archdeacons of Surrey
Deans of Ely
1951 deaths